Botsford is a civil parish in Westmorland County, New Brunswick, Canada.

For governance purposes it was divided between the villages of Cap-Pelé and Port Elgin; the incorporated rural community of Beaubassin East; and the local service districts of Bayfield, Cape Tormentine, and the parish of Botsford.

All governance units are members of the Southeast Regional Service Commission.

Origin of name
The parish was named in honour of Amos Botsford, then Speaker of the House of Assembly and MLA for Westmorland County.

History
Botsford was erected in 1805 from unassigned territory east of Sackville and Westmorland Parishes.

In 1850 the western boundary moved west to match that of Westmorland Parish, adding part of Shediac Parish.

In 1894 the western boundary was altered on its northern end, losing area to Shediac Parish; the change was made retroactive to the erection of the parish.

In 1904 the northern of the boundary with Shediac was clarified, possibly altered.

Boundaries
Botsford Parish is bounded:

 on the north by Northumberland Strait;
 on the south by Baie Verte
 on the southwest by a line running north 38º 30' west from the southeast angle of lot number one, granted to Otho Reed, at the mouth of Gaspereau Creek in Port Elgin to a point about 1.6 kilometres northwesterly of the junction of Chemin des Moulins and Route 940 and about 450 metres from Square Lake, then running north 4º 30' east to the Northumberland Strait at a point about 375 metres east of the mouth of the Tedish River in Cap-Pelé.

Communities
Communities at least partly within the parish. bold indicates an incorporated municipality

  Bayfield
 Bayside
  Beaubassin East
 Botsford Portage
 Comeau Point
 Lake Road
 Petit-Cap
  Shemogue
 Trois-Ruisseaux
 Cadman Corner
  Cap-Pelé
 Bas-Cap-Pelé
 Cape Spear
  Cape Tormentine
 Chapmans Corner
 Hardy
 Johnston Point Road
  Little Shemogue
 Malden
 Mates Corner
  Melrose
  Murray Corner
 Murray Road
  Port Elgin
 Smith Settlement
 Spence Settlement
 The Bluff
 Timber River
 Upper Cape
 Woodside

Bodies of water
Bodies of water at least partly within the parish.

 Gaspereau River
 Timber River
 Amos Creek
 Fox Creek
 Grant Creek
 Lanchester Creek
 McKays Creek
 Robinson Creek
 Northumberland Strait
 Abegweit Passage
  Baie Verte
 Shemogue Harbour
 Collins Lake
 Niles Lake
 Square Lake

Islands
Islands at least partly within the parish.
 Ephraim Island
  Jourimain Island

Other notable places
Parks, historic sites, and other noteworthy places at least partly within the parish.
 Confederation Bridge
 Murray Beach Provincial Park

Demographics
Parish population total does not include portions within 2021 boundaries of Cap-Pelé, Port Elgin, and Beaubassin East. Revised census figures based on the 2023 local governance reforms have not been released.

Access routes
Highways and numbered routes that run through the parish, including external routes that start or finish at the parish limits:

Highways

Principal Routes

Secondary Routes:
none

External Routes:
(Confederation Bridge)

See also
List of parishes in New Brunswick

Notes

References

External links
 Rural community of Beaubassin East
 Village of Cap-Pelé

Parishes of Westmorland County, New Brunswick
Local service districts of Westmorland County, New Brunswick